Queen Elizabeth's Oak may refer to:
 Queen Elizabeth's Oak, Hatfield House, Hertfordshire
 Queen Elizabeth's Oak, Greenwich Park, London
 Queen Elizabeth Oak in Cowdray Park, West Sussex

See also

 Queen's Oak near Potterspury, Northamptonshire. Traditionally regarded as the meeting place of Edward IV and his queen Elizabeth Woodville